RCVS may refer to:
 Royal College of Veterinary Surgeons
 Reversible cerebral vasoconstriction syndrome